Chugye University for the Arts is a South Korean institute of higher education in the fine arts. The campus is in Seodaemun-gu in central Seoul, the country's capital.

Academics

Undergraduate courses are offered toward Bachelor of Arts, Bachelor of Music, and Bachelor of Fine Arts degrees. They are provided by colleges of Music, Fine Arts, and Literature.

Graduate offerings at the Master's level are provided through the Graduate School of Arts Management.

Education philosophy
Sincerity, Creativity and Idealization are the university's education motto. The school aims at ‘Balance of Education’ by cultivating a few, talented art elites with professional knowledge and deep understanding of highly cultured life.

The university, in harmony with arts and life, puts emphasis on as much hands-on skill and experience of art as theory in class. Students here are taught art, philosophy and human nature. The university believes this will help students gain a greater understanding of arts and express their thoughts creatively through arts. Now Chugye University for the Arts has become among the nation's top art schools. Our alumni take significant positions throughout the world of arts as performers, composers, painters, writers, and educators.

In preparation for the 21st century, the university is strengthening its efforts under the ambitious plan of "Vision ChuGye 21" to develop new curricula and to restructure the organization and administration process in the context of globalization by eliminating outdated rules and red tapes that hamper innovation and efficiency. These efforts will require firm determination and patience of all the university constituencies, including the students, in responding properly to the challenge from this rapidly changing environment of education.

History
In 1973, ChuGye University for the Arts was established by the ChuGye School Foundation of Hwang Shin-duk. Since its establishment, the University has contributed to the creation of intellectual freedom as well as to the professional achievement in Art by training talented students.

In November 1973, the ChuGye School Foundation was approved by the Ministry of Education for founding a junior college of arts. In March 1974, the college first opened its doors with an enrollment of 200 students over Korean Music, Voice, Instruments, Korean Painting and Western Painting departments. Hyung Bin Yim was inaugurated as its first president.

Extending the schooling period from two to four years in January 1976, the college began to offer more variety of education in the arts. The Department of Piano (1980) and the Department of Creative Writing (1982) were established.

The college has become an accredited university by the government to confer the degrees of B.A., B.M., and B.F.A. under its new name “ChuGye University for the Arts” since 1997. Students are required to obtain 140 credits or more and to pass ‘academic evaluation for graduation’ to get undergraduate degrees.

Chugye University for the Arts has marked a new epoch by establishing a Graduate School of Arts Management. The Graduate School of Art Management, ChuGye University for the Arts provides master's degree programs on arts management as well as on planning and research of the culture.

More than 1,000 students are now enjoying their student lives and strengthening their talents at the university being proud of its prestigious location, downtown in Seoul. The university has recently launched ambitious projects such as constructing a state-of-the-art integrated information management system called ‘CHIIMS’, restructuring the faculty and administration organizations and developing new curricula fit for the coming knowledge-based society under the university's ambitious medium- and long-term development plan of "Vision ChuGye 21" under which the university will ensure the students’ bright future with its totally refurbished infrastructure in software and hardware.

Notable people
Jun Kwang-ryul, actor
Moon Chae-won, actress
Park Hyun-bin, singer

See also

List of colleges and universities in South Korea
Education in South Korea

External links
Official school website, in English and Korean

 
Culture of Seoul
Art schools in South Korea
Music schools in South Korea
Universities and colleges in Seoul
1974 establishments in South Korea
Educational institutions established in 1974
Seodaemun District